William M. Beecher (born May 27, 1933) is a former Washington correspondent for The Boston Globe, The Wall Street Journal and The New York Times. He also served as Washington bureau chief for the Minneapolis Star Tribune. He spent two years as a senior official of the Defense Department and ten years as a top official of the Nuclear Regulatory Commission. He has authored eight novels. In retirement, he is an adjunct professor at the University of Maryland.

Education 

Beecher earned a B.A. from Harvard University, where he was an editor of The Harvard Crimson, and an M.S. from Columbia University. During his college career he worked as campus correspondent for The Boston Globe and The Boston Herald Traveler.

Novelist 

Beecher authored the following novels: Mayday Man (1990), Submerged Rage: The Hidden Grievance (2005), The Acorn Dossier (2009), Nuclear Revenge (2010), The KGB Hoax (2013), Arabella Undercover (2014), Double Agent Stallion (2015) and Jihadi Revenge (2016).

References 

1933 births
Living people
People from Framingham, Massachusetts
The Boston Globe people
The Wall Street Journal people
The New York Times writers
Star Tribune people
St. Louis Globe-Democrat people
Columbia University Graduate School of Journalism alumni
University of Maryland, College Park faculty
United States Department of Defense officials
20th-century American novelists
20th-century American male writers
Novelists from Massachusetts
21st-century American novelists
American male novelists
The Harvard Crimson people
21st-century American male writers
Novelists from New York (state)
Novelists from Maryland
20th-century American non-fiction writers
21st-century American non-fiction writers
American male non-fiction writers